Bhutandevi Mandir is a Hindu temple dedicated to goddess Bhutandevi (Hidimbi), located in Hetauda city of Bagmati Province, Nepal. Hidimba is one of the wives of Bhima (one of the Pandavas) and the mother of Ghatotkacha, a hero of Kurukshetra War. Bhutandevi is also considered to be another form of goddess Durga. The city of Hetauda itself is believed to be named after the goddess Hidimba.

Gallery

See also 

 Gadhimai
 Kushmanda Sarowar Triveni Dham

References

Hindu temples in Hetauda
Makwanpur District